As of 2022 there were 8 daily newspapers in Slovakia.
Below is a list of newspapers published in Slovakia.

Daily newspapers 
{| class="sortable wikitable"
! Title
! Website
! Established
! Owner
! Notes
|-
| SME || website || 1993 || Petit Press || the best-selling Slovak political-oriented daily, centre-right in political orientation
|-
| Korzár || website || 1998 || Petit Press || political-oriented daily on East of Slovakia, the only daily regional newspaper in Slovakia
|-
| Denník N || website || 2015 || N Press || political-oriented daily, centre-right in political orientation
|-
| Pravda || website || 1920 || OUR MEDIA SR || political-oriented daily, centre-left in political orientation, the oldest daily newspaper in Slovakia
|-
| Hospodárske noviny || website || 1993 || MAFRA Slovakia || business-oriented daily
|-
| Nový Čas || website || 1991 || FPD Media || tabloid, the best-selling newspaper in Slovakia
|-
| Plus jeden deň || website || 2006 || News and Media Holding || tabloid
|-
| Šport || website ||  || Šport Press || sport-oriented daily
|}

Weekly newspapers 
{| class="sortable wikitable"
! Title
! Website
! Established
! Owner
! Notes
|-
| MY || website || || Petit Press || multi-regional newspaper
|-
| Katolícke noviny || website || 1849 || 	Spolok svätého Vojtecha || Christian newspaper
|-
| Prešovský večerník || website || 1990 || || regional newspaper based in Prešov
|-
| Roľnícke noviny || website || 1930 || Profi Press|| farming and agricultural newspaper
|-
| Sninské noviny || website || 2002 || || regional newspaper based in Snina
|-
| Záhorák || website || 1960 || Záhorák || regional newspaper
|-
| Zdravotnícke noviny || website || 1952 || News and Media Holding || medical newspaper
|-
| Žilinský večerník || website || 1991 ||Publishing House || regional newspaper based in Žilina
|}

Free regional weekly newspapers 
{| class="sortable wikitable"
! Title
! Website
! Owner
! Notes
|-
| ECHO || website || Petit Press || multi-regional newspapers
|-
| Pardon || website || Petit Press || multi-regional newspapers
|-
| Regionálne noviny || website || Region Press || multi-regional newspapers
|-
| Bratislavský kuriér || website || Staromešťan || regional newspaper based in Bratislava
|-
| Bratislavské noviny || website || Nivel Plus || regional newspaper based in Bratislava
|}

Other language newspapers 
{| class="sortable wikitable"
! Title
! Website
! Language
! Established
! Owner
! Notes
|-
| The Slovak Spectator || website || English || 1995 || Petit Press ||
|-
| Új Szó || website || Hungarian || 1948 || DUEL - PRESS ||
|}

Defunct 
{| class="sortable wikitable"
! Title
! Established
! Ceased publication
! Owner
! Notes
|-
| Košický večer || 1969 || 2004 || Petit Press || daily regional newspaper based in Košice
|-
| Národná obroda  || 1990 || 2005 || Pegas 2 Slovakia || daily newspaper
|-
| 24 hodín  || 2005|| 2006 || Pegas 2 Slovakia || daily newspaper
|-
| Kysucký večerník  || 2013 || 2017 || Publishing House || weekly regional newspaper
|-
| Noviny Poprad  || 1990 || 2019 || mesto Poprad || weekly regional newspaper based in Poprad
|-
| Podtatranské noviny || 1960 || 2020 || || weekly regional newspaper based in Poprad
|}

See also
List of newspapers

References

Slovakia
Newspapers
List